Pool B of the 2017 Fed Cup Americas Zone Group I was one of two pools in the Americas zone of the 2017 Fed Cup. Five teams competed in a round robin competition, with the top team and the bottom two teams proceeding to their respective sections of the play-offs: the top team played for advancement to the World Group II Play-offs, while the bottom two teams faced potential relegation to Group II.

Standings 

Standings are determined by: 1. number of wins; 2. number of matches; 3. in two-team ties, head-to-head records; 4. in three-team ties, (a) percentage of sets won (head-to-head records if two teams remain tied), then (b) percentage of games won (head-to-head records if two teams remain tied), then (c) Fed Cup rankings.

Round-robin

Argentina vs. Chile

Brazil vs. Colombia

Argentina vs. Colombia

Brazil vs. Mexico

Argentina vs. Mexico

Colombia vs. Chile

Argentina vs. Brazil

Mexico vs. Chile

Brazil vs. Chile

Mexico vs. Colombia

References

External links 
 Fed Cup website

2017 Fed Cup Americas Zone